Bárbara Luz (born 28 May 1993) is a former professional tennis player from Portugal.

She won three singles titles and one doubles title on the ITF Circuit. On 26 May 2014, she reached a career-high singles ranking of world No. 368. On 20 October 2014, she peaked at No. 446 in the WTA doubles rankings.

Playing for the Portugal Fed Cup team, Luz has a 2–9 win–loss record.

ITF finals

Singles: 9 (3 titles, 6 runner-ups)

Doubles: 4 (1 title, 3 runner-ups)

Fed Cup/Billie Jean King Cup participation

Singles

Doubles

References

 
 
 

1993 births
Living people
Sportspeople from Coimbra
Portuguese female tennis players
21st-century Portuguese women